Neurotripsicks is the first full-length studio album by the technical death metal band Gorod.  In 2004, the album was released under their original name, Gorgasm, on Deadsun Records.  In 2005, on Willowtip Records, the album was re-released with two bonus tracks and under their current name of Gorod.

Track listing 
Recorded & mixed at BUD Records Studios,

 "Intro" – 1:23
 "Gutting Job" – 3:55
 "Smoked Skulls" – 4:00
 "Hunt to the Weaks" – 4:23
 "Beware of Tramps" – 4:42
 "Pig's Bloated Face" – 5:27
 "Harmony in Torture" – 4:59
 "Rusted Nails Attack" – 5:15
 "Earth Pus" – 4:39
 "Neuronal Disorder State" – 5:44

2005 Re-release Tracks
<li>"Gorod (1999)"
<li>"Submission Transfer (2005)"

Credits 
 Guillaume Martinot - Vocals
 Arnaud Pontaco - Guitar
 Mathieu Pascal - Guitar
 Benoit Claus - Bass
 Sandrine - Drums

Release history

References 

2004 albums
Willowtip Records albums
Gorod (band) albums